Camparada is a comune (municipality) in the Province of Monza and Brianza in the Italian region Lombardy, located about  northeast of Milan.

Camparada borders the following municipalities: Casatenovo, Usmate Velate, Lesmo, Arcore.

References